Ot me-Avshalom (Hebrew: אות מאבשלום Translation: A Letter from Avshalom or A Sign from Avshalom) is a novel by Israeli author Nava Macmel-Atir published by Yediot Books in 2009. The book quickly became a best-seller, and Macmel-Atir received the Golden Book award for selling 20,000 copies in just three months after its release. Half a year after its publication, Ot me-Avshalom received the Platinum Book award from the Book Publishers Association of Israel for selling 40,000 copies. In June 2015, it received the "Diamond Book" commemoration for selling 100,000 copies.

Plot 

A young graphologist, Alma Bach, embarks on the trail of a man whose handwriting was sent to her for analysis. She discovers characteristics such as sharp wit, high degree of general knowledge, and courage. She discovers a passionate man with a highly developed imagination, linguistic style, and the sensitivity of an artist, a man with a magnetic personality who draws people to him while at the same time secluding himself and keeping a secret, and who is capable of loving at great magnitudes and willing to sacrifice for his love, for his love of the land, for his love of a woman, and eventually to pay the ultimate price. Alma is determined to meet this man face-to-face.

The story moves back and forth between two time periods: modern-day Israel, where Alma undergoes her journey to discover the man, and a biographical depiction of Avshalom Feinberg, founder and leader of the Nili spy ring, which starts in late 19th-century Palestine and continues into the early 20th century.

Awards 
 Golden Book Commemoration – Book Publishers Association of Israel – September 2009
 Platinum Book Commemoration – Book Publishers Association of Israel – January 2010
 Diamond Book Commemoration – Book Publishers Association of Israel – June 2015

External links 
 Nava Macmel-Atir Official Website (Hebrew)
 Ot me-Avshalom at the Israeli Hebrew Authors Union (Hebrew)

References 

Books by Nava Macmel-Atir
2009 novels
Books about Israel
Biographies (books)
Biographical novels
Novels about rebels
History books about Israel
Novels set in Israel
21st-century Israeli novels
Israeli biographies
Spy novels
Novels set in Ottoman Syria